Urpilainen is a Finnish surname. Notable people with the surname include:

 Kari Urpilainen (born 1951), Finnish politician
 Jutta Urpilainen (born 1975), Finnish politician, daughter of Kari

Finnish-language surnames